The 19th Biathlon World Championships were held in 1982 for the second time in Minsk, Belarus, at that time part of the Soviet Union.

Men's results

20 km individual

10 km sprint

4 × 7.5 km relay

Medal table

References

1982
Biathlon World Championships
International sports competitions hosted by the Soviet Union
Biathlon World Championships
Biathlon World Championships
Biathlon World Championships
Biathlon competitions in the Soviet Union
Biathlon competitions in Belarus
Sports competitions in Minsk
1980s in Minsk